John Bell Blish (September 8, 1860 – December 22, 1921) was an American inventor known primarily for developing the Blish lock, used in the Thompson submachine gun, more commonly known as the "Tommy Gun." Blish licensed the patent for his lock to the Auto-Ordnance Corporation in 1915 in return for company stock.

Blish was a career United States naval officer, serving as executive officer on the U.S. warships Niagara and Vicksburg (PG-11) during the Spanish–American War. He retired from the United States Navy with the rank of Commander in 1919.

Blish was buried at Arlington National Cemetery.

Namesake
The USS John Blish, a survey ship commissioned during World War II, was named after him.

External links
Dictionary of American Naval Fighting Ships: John Blish
Genealogical and Historical Page for John Bell Blish
The Unofficial Tommy Gun Page

1860 births
1921 deaths
20th-century American inventors
American military personnel of the Spanish–American War
Burials at Arlington National Cemetery
United States Navy officers

References